Negative is a Finnish glam rock band founded in 1997. The band itself labels the music as ”emotional rock’n roll”.

Members

Current
Jonne Aaron Liimatainen - Lead vocals
Antti Anatomy - Bass
Mr. Snack/Nakki - Keyboard, vocals
Jay Slammer - Drums
Hata Salmi - Guitar

Previous
Sir Christus - Guitar, vocals (deceased)
Larry Love - Guitar
Gary - Guitar (Guitarist in gig in summer 2008 – not an actual member of the band)
Dmitry Martinov - Bass (session member)

Related bands 
Jonne Aaron's younger brother, Ville Liimatainen, is the lead singer of the Finnish rock band, Flinch, who are managed by Hype Productions, the same label as Negative. He contributed backing vocals to Negative's cover of Queen's "Too Much Love Will Kill You" alongside Jussi Selo from Uniklubi (who also contributed to backing vocals on some Negative tracks), in which Jonne shared the limelight with Jann Wilde from Jann Wilde and Rose Avenue, and Christian from Dead By Gun.
Sir Christus (guitar) previously played bass in his younger brother's band, Bloodpit. Antti Anatomy (bass) made a guest appearance as a vengeful brother in 2007's "Wise Men Don't Cry", released as a single from Bloodpit's second album, "Off The Hook".
Negative has toured with Jann Wilde and Rose Avenue before that band broke up (as they shared Tommi Liimatainen's management, who is Jonne's older brother.) as well as a triple team-up with The Rasmus and HIM in 2005.
Teemu Rajamäki, bassist for Uniklubi, has also appeared as guest musician on some concerts.

Discography

Albums 
War of Love (2003 - FIN #5)
Sweet & Deceitful (2004 - FIN #1)
Anorectic (2006 - FIN #1)
Karma Killer (2008 - FIN #3)
God Likes Your Style (2009) [B Sides]
Neon (2010)

Singles 
"After All" (2003 - FIN #4)
"The Moment of Our Love" (2003 - FIN #1)
"Still Alive" (2004 - FIN #4)
"Frozen to Lose it All" (2004 - FIN #1)
"In My Heaven" (2004 - FIN #1)
"My My, Hey Hey" (2005 - FIN #1)
"Dark Side (Until You're Mine)" (2005 - FIN #2)
"Bright Side (About My Sorrow)" (2005 - FIN #2)
"The Moment Of Our Love (Intl. Release)" (2005 - GER #28)
"Planet of the Sun" (2006 - FIN #1)
"Sinners Night / Misty Morning" (2006 - FIN #2)
"Fading Yourself" (2007 - FIN #1)
"Won't Let Go" (2008)
"Giving Up!" (2008)
"End Of The Line* (2010)
"Jealous Sky" (2010)
"Believe" (2011)

DVDs 
In the Eye of the Hurricane (2008 - Fin #1)

References

External links
  (Finnish, English, Japanese)
 Negative Myspace
 Interview with Jonne Aaron "Songwriter Till The Day I Die " April 28, 2010

Finnish musical groups
Musical groups established in 1997
Musical quintets
MTV Europe Music Award winners